The Nations Cup 1968–69 was the ninth edition of a European rugby union championship for national teams, and fourth with the formula and the name of "Nations Cup".

The tournament was won for the first time by Romania, who won all their four games, including a 15–14 win over France at home.

First division 
Table

Poland and Germany relegated to division 2
Results

Poland-Germany not played

Second division

Pool 1 
 Table

 Results

Pool 2 
Table

 Results

Pool 3 
Table

 Results

Final Pool 
Table

Italy promoted to division 1

 Results

Bibliography 
 Francesco Volpe, Valerio Vecchiarelli (2000), 2000 Italia in Meta, Storia della nazionale italiana di rugby dagli albori al Sei Nazioni, GS Editore (2000) 
 Francesco Volpe, Paolo Pacitti (Author), Rugby 2000, GTE Gruppo Editorale (1999).

References

External links
 FIRA-AER official website

1968–69 in European rugby union
1968-69
1969 rugby union tournaments for national teams
1968 rugby union tournaments for national teams